Val-des-Monts is a municipality in the Outaouais region of Quebec, Canada, located about  north of Ottawa, Ontario. It has a population of 13,328 residents in 2021. Formed in 1975 by the merger of the towns of Perkins, Saint-Pierre-de-Wakefield and Poltimore, it consists mainly of farms and mountainous forests. Many of its residents commute to Ottawa or Gatineau for work. Due to its numerous lakes, its population is boosted during summers by people living in cottages. Most of the people in Val-des-Monts live in the village of Perkins.

Toponymy
The name of Val-des-Monts is from the French words Val which means "small valley" and Monts which means "mounts". This name is a reference to the fact that the territory of the municipality includes several valleys and mountains.

Geography
The municipality of Val-des-Monts is located at approximately 10 km north of Gatineau and 220 km west of Montreal. It is part of Les Collines-de-l'Outaouais Regional County Municipality within Outaouais region. It is also part of the National Capital Region which includes Ottawa and Gatineau as well as some adjacent municipalities.

The territory of Val-des-Monts is composed mainly of lakes, farming lands and forests. The largest lakes are McGregor, Grand, l'Écluse and Newcombe.

The municipality of Val-des-Monts shares its borders with the municipalities of Denholm and Bowman to the north, Notre-Dame-de-la-Salette and L'Ange-Gardien to the east, La Pêche to the west, and Cantley and Gatineau to the south.

The two main highways crossing Val-des-Monts are provincial highways 307 and 366. The municipal road network includes more than 270 km of roads.

History
The first settlers of the territory of Val-des-Monts arrived during the 19th century. From 1878 the region was booming economically, thanks to the discovery of phosphate. From 1892 the phosphate production began decreasing while the mica production began to develop. The Blackburn brothers' mine that was located to the northeast of Perkins was recognized as the biggest mica mine in Canada. At end of the 1910s the mica production was falling. At this time, after having exploited the mining and forestry resources, the inhabitants started to leave the region.

The municipality of Val-des-Monts was created in 1975 by the merging of the municipalities of Perkins, Saint-Pierre-de-Wakefield and Poltimore. Nowadays it is mainly the attraction of living around the lakes that is drawing a large part of the population.

On June 23, 2010, at 1:41 p.m. ET, a magnitude 5.0 earthquake hit Val-des-Monts. The earthquake was felt as far away as Montreal, Boston and Cleveland.

Demographics

Languages
According to the 2021 Canadian Census by Statistics Canada, 62% of Val-des-Monts' population speak both official languages of Canada while 32% speak only French and 6% speak only English.

At home, 84% speak only French, 13% only English, and 2% both English and French. Beside the language spoken the most often at home, 6% also speak English and 3% also speak French.

Among the population who worked, 68.9% use French most often at work, 24.5% English, and 6.5% both English and French. Beside the language spoken the most often at work, 34.9% also use English and 15.6% also use French.

Local government

Val-des-Monts forms part of the federal electoral district of Pontiac and has been represented by Sophie Chatel of the Liberal Party since 2021. Provincially, Val-des-Monts is part of the Gatineau electoral district and is represented by Robert Bussière of the Coalition Avenir Québec since 2018.

Mayors
List of mayors of Val-des-Monts since 2005 and the year of their election:
 Marc Carrière (2005)
 Jean Lafrenière (2008 and 2009)
 Jacques Laurin (2013 and 2017)

Tourism
Val-des-Monts is part of the Outaouais touristic region. The main touristic attractions are outdoors activities, campgrounds and snowmobile trails. The municipality is also known for fishing since it has 125 lakes suitable for fishing.

Every year since 2011, Val-des-Monts has hosted a country music festival.

Gallery

See also
 List of municipalities in Quebec

References

External links

Municipality of Val-des-Monts Website
 Affaires Municipales et Regions Quebec
 Statistics Canada
 Elections Canada Results - 39th General Election (2006)
 Director General of Quebec Elections
 Official Transport Quebec Road Map

Incorporated places in Outaouais
Municipalities in Quebec
National Capital Region (Canada)